Lúcio Teófilo da Silva, better known as Lúcio Curió (born 2 July 1984) is a Brazilian football player. He is currently at the América Futebol Clube (RN). Previously he has represented a number of teams in the north–east of Brazil, and a number of teams in South Korea.

Career
Lúcio Curió began his professional career at CSP in Paraíba state. Whilst a CSP player, he served loan spells with larger clubs, making two substitute appearances in Série A for Sport Recife in 2008. On 10 May 2009 he scored his first professional goal for America-RN in a 2–1 Série B defeat to Atlético Goianiense. He scored a total of 15 goals in the season, two behind the top scorer in the division.

In 2010, he moved to South Korea to join K League side Gyeongnam FC. He was top scorer in the league season for the team with 13 goals. On 21 July 2011, he transferred to fellow K League side Ulsan Hyundai. He failed to score in fifteen games.

On 29 February 2012 he returned to Brazil, and to America-RN for a second spell. He scored a further 10 Série B goals during the season.

For the 2013 season Lúcio Curió started a second spell in South Korea, with K League Challenge side Gwangju FC. He again returned to Brazil on 12 February 2014, signing for ABC on a one-year contract. However, after some criticism from the fans, he left after less than three months to join Botafogo-PB.

Lúcio Curió left Botafogo-PB at the end of the Série C and didn't sign again for a professional side until the end of 2015. Amidst suggestions of a return to America-RN for a third spell, he returned to Paraíba state, signing for Treze on 28 November 2015 for the duration of the 2016 Campeonato Paraibano. He scored 3 goals in 6 games, but on 16 March 2016, with the club having won only two of its first 8 games in the competition, and not having secured a place in the second phase, he had his contract terminated, along with four other players.

A day after leaving Treze, Lúcio Curió did sign for America-RN for a third spell.

References

External links 
 
 

1984 births
Living people
Association football forwards
Brazilian footballers
Gyeongnam FC players
Ulsan Hyundai FC players
Gwangju FC players
K League 1 players
K League 2 players
Nacional Atlético Clube (Patos) players
Esporte Clube Novo Hamburgo players
Sport Club do Recife players
América Futebol Clube (RN) players
ABC Futebol Clube players
Expatriate footballers in South Korea
Brazilian expatriate footballers
Brazilian expatriate sportspeople in South Korea
Sportspeople from Paraíba
Centro Sportivo Paraibano players